Hamish Duncan Rutherford (born 27 April 1989) is a New Zealand cricketer who plays first-class cricket for Otago and represents New Zealand in international cricket. A left-handed batsman, occasional left-arm spin bowler and Twenty20 specialist, Rutherford is the son of former New Zealand Test captain Ken Rutherford and nephew of Ian Rutherford.

Domestic career
He was the leading run-scorer in the 2017–18 Plunket Shield season for Otago, with 577 runs in ten matches. In June 2018, he was awarded a contract with Otago for the 2018–19 season. He was also the leading run-scorer for Otago in the 2018–19 Ford Trophy, with 393 runs in seven matches, and the leading run-scorer for the team in the 2018–19 Super Smash, with 227 runs in nine matches.

In June 2020, he was offered a contract by Otago ahead of the 2020–21 domestic cricket season.

International career
He scored a century (171) on his Test match debut against England, which is the seventh-highest score on debut. It is also second on the list for a left-handed debutant and a test opener on debut, in both cases behind Jacques Rudolph.

Concussion 
Rutherford has suffered a number of concussions playing cricket. The most recent occurred in December 2020 during training resulting in him missing several games for Otago. He has previously been hit while batting by Jofra Archer in 2019 while negotiating a bouncer. Lockie Ferguson also struck him on the helmet with a lifting delivery during the 2019/2020 New Zealand domestic one-day final. He had scored 36 runs off 25 balls at the time. In 2015, Scott Kuggeleijn also bowled a ball that hit Rutherford resulting in Rutherford taking three months off cricket to recover.

References

External links
 

1989 births
Living people
New Zealand cricketers
Otago cricketers
New Zealand One Day International cricketers
New Zealand Test cricketers
New Zealand Twenty20 International cricketers
Cricketers from Dunedin
Cricketers who made a century on Test debut
Essex cricketers
Derbyshire cricketers
Worcestershire cricketers
Glamorgan cricketers